NorthAmeriCon '79 was the second North American Science Fiction Convention, held in Louisville, Kentucky, on August 30-September 3, 1979, at the Galt House Hotel.   This NASFiC was held because Brighton, England, was selected as the location for the 1979 Worldcon.

Guests of honor
 Frederik Pohl, pro
 George Scithers, fan

Information

Site selection
After the 1979 Worldcon was awarded to a site in England, Louisville was chosen as the site for the second NASFiC during the WSFS business meeting at Suncon, the 35th World Science Fiction Convention, in Miami Beach, Florida. Louisville ran unopposed and was chosen by acclamation during the business meeting.

Committee
NorthAmeriCon '79 was put together, in part, by the organizers of RiverCon, a local Louisville convention.

 Chair: Cliff Amos
 Vice-Chair: Bob Roehm
 Operations: Ken Amos
 Registrar: Steve Francis
 Special Events: Shelby Bush and Irvin Koch
 Publications: Bob Roehm
 Art Show: Ken & Lou Moore
 Film Program: Mike Hutto and Mike Jenevice

Newsletter
The official convention newsletter, known as Nebula, was produced by Richard and Nicki Lynch.  The Lynches produced the award-winning fanzine Mimosa from 1982 to 2003.

Events
"Best in Show" at the Masquerade was won by a burlesque skit titled "The Avengers of Space" organized by Carol Resnick and including her husband, author Mike Resnick.

Notable program participants
Steve Jackson, later of Steve Jackson Games, was in attendance. In Space Gamer #29, he noted: "Labor Day, 1979: I was at North Americon in Louisville, trying to relax. In my spare moments, I would occasionally gaze at my briefcase and grin mindlessly. It contained a completely typeset copy of TFT:ITL" (i.e. The Fantasy Trip: In the Labyrinth, which would not be published until the following year).

See also
 World Science Fiction Society

References

External links
 NASFiC Official Site
 

North American Science Fiction Convention
Festivals in Louisville, Kentucky
1979 in the United States
1979 in Kentucky